{{DISPLAYTITLE:C21H30O2}}
The molecular formula C21H30O2 (molar mass: 314.46 g/mol) may refer to:

 Abnormal cannabidiol
 17α-Allyl-19-nortestosterone
 Cannabichromene
 Cannabicyclol
 Cannabidiol
 Delta-6-Cannabidiol
 20α-Dihydrodydrogesterone
 5α-Dihydrolevonorgestrel
 5α-Dihydroethisterone
 Ethinylandrostenediol
 Hydroxytibolones
 3α-Hydroxytibolone
 3β-Hydroxytibolone
 17α-Methyl-19-norprogesterone
 Metynodiol
 Progesterone
 Retroprogesterone
 Tetrahydrocannabinol
 Delta-3-Tetrahydrocannabinol
 Delta-4-Tetrahydrocannabinol
 Delta-7-Tetrahydrocannabinol
 Delta-8-Tetrahydrocannabinol
 Delta-10-Tetrahydrocannabinol
 Vinyltestosterone
 Cannabicitran